Hexameryx is an extinct monospecific genus of the artiodactyl family Antilocapridae endemic to North America. It lived during the Pliocene epoch 5.3—4.9 mya. It had six well-forked horns.

References

 Late Cretaceous and Cenozoic Mammals of North America: Biostratigraphy and Geochronology by Michael O. Woodburne  
 Pleistocene Mammals of North America by Bjýýrn Kurtýýn and Elaine Anderson  
 Florida's Fossils: Guide to Location, Identification and Enjoyment by Robin C. Brown  
 Horns, Tusks, and Flippers: The Evolution of Hoofed Mammals by Donald R. Prothero and Robert M. Schoch

External links
Hexameryx in the Paleobiology Database

Pliocene even-toed ungulates
Pliocene mammals of North America
Prehistoric pronghorns
Fossil taxa described in 1941
Prehistoric even-toed ungulate genera